Alpine was a town in the Cascade Mountains, near Skykomish, Washington. Founded in the late 19th century and originally named Nippon, it was first built to house Japanese railway workers. Another nearby railway town, Corea, housed Korean workers.

The local lumber baron changed the town's name from Nippon to Alpine in 1903. In 1917 it was reported as a station on the Great Northern Railway. Its population peaked at 200–300 people; after the nearby woods were logged out, it was evacuated and intentionally burned, around 1929.

Author Mary Daheim, whose family, the Dawsons, lived in Alpine approximately 1916–1922 (before she was born) sets her "Emma Lord" mystery novels in a fictional, surviving town of Alpine.

References 

Ghost towns in Washington (state)
Company towns in Washington (state)
Populated places in King County, Washington
Japanese-American culture in Washington (state)